Justin Pietersen (born 28 August 1986 in Cape Town, South Africa) is a South African figure skater. He is the 2005 and 2007 South African national champion. His older sister Abigail Pietersen is also an elite senior-level figure skater.

Competitive highlights

 J = Junior level; QR = Qualifying Round

External links
 

Living people
1986 births
South African male single skaters
Sportspeople from Cape Town